The International Gay and Lesbian Football Association (IGLFA) is an international organization which was founded in 1992 with the intention of promoting association football (known as soccer in the United States and football in most of the rest of the world) in the gay and lesbian community and to promote gay and lesbian football to the world at large.

The IGLFA is the governing body of LGBT football and regulates the association football portion of the Gay Games as well as the Official IGLFA World, North American and European Championships.

History
While the IGLFA was formed in 1992, LGBT football teams competed against each other at the first Gay Games in 1982, and an autonomous international championship event was held annually beginning in 1987. Beginning in 1992, a European competition has been held by the IGLFA, though it is separate from the currently-recognized European championship which began in 2011; a North American championship also began in 2011. The IGLFA World Championships were held every year from 1992 to 2010, but now are held only on even-numbered years; odd-numbered years are currently used for the continental championships and other competitions. However, due to the COVID-19 pandemic, there was no 2020 world championship nor any 2021 regional championships.

Beginning in 2019, IGFLA also began recognizing the Sin City Classic, the largest annual LGBT sports event in the world, as the official indoor championship, though the Las Vegas tournament had held soccer tournaments for many years before. This tournament is otherwise known as the IGLFA World Indoor Championship.

All IGLFA tournaments are split into Mixed Gender and Female competitions. Whilst the majority of participants in the mixed gender competition are male, all genders are permitted to participate.

As of February 2020, 39 tournaments have been held, including 7 tournaments before IGLFA, 23 IGLFA World Championships, 4 IGLFA Euro Championships, 2 IGLFA North American championships, 2 official indoor championships, and 1 IGLFA Unity cup. Stonewall FC is the most successful mixed gender club, having won 11 times (1995, 2000, 2001, 2002, 2006, 2008, 2009, 2010, 2011, 2014, 2019). Other clubs who have won the male competition multiple times are San Francisco Spikes (7 times), Cream Team Cologne (3 times), West Hollywood Soccer Club (3 times), SAFG Argentina (2 times), Federal Triangles Soccer Club (2 times), and the Minnesota Gray Ducks (2 times). There are currently no repeat Champions in the female competition.

World championships

The association is affiliated with the Federation of Gay Games and awards the annual Tom Waddell Memorial Trophy (created in 1988) to the winner of its mixed gender tournament (held as part of the Gay Games in years when that event is held).

Tournaments and champions
Below is a summary of Mixed Gender Div.1, Mixed Gender Div.2, and Female champions at IGLFA's major international tournaments and their predecessors.  Parentheses indicate the number of times a city has hosted or the number of times a team has won Div.1 titles and therefore crowned as IGLFA World Champions. Italics represent indoor championships.

*The Sydney tournament is still considered part of the 2022 30th anniversary celebrations despite taking coinciding with WorldPride in Feb. 2023.

Medalists
The following is a list of all clubs that have earned multiple medals at IGLFA-recognized tournaments (since 1992).
 Legend
  — Mixed gender 1st Division
  — Mixed gender 2nd Division
  — Mixed gender 3rd Division
  — Female 1st Division
  — Female 2nd Division
 Italics — Indoor championship
 * — Shared result (combined team or tie)

See also
 Gay Football Supporters Network
 List of IGLFA member clubs

References
IGLFA past tournaments

External links
IGLFA's Main Web Site
IGLFA 2009 Event Web Site

Sports organizations established in 1992
International LGBT sports organizations
Association football governing bodies
Association football culture
Association football issues
History of association football